Valéria Hidvéghy or Valerie Pascal Delacorte (14 June 1914 – 14 July 2011) was a Hungarian actress.

Life 
Delacorte was born in Budapest and broke through the iron curtain to marry the film producer Gabriel Pascal. She is best known today for her 1970 memoir of him, The Disciple and His Devil: Gabriel Pascal and Bernard Shaw. In a letter to the editor of the New York Times in 1995 she wrote that the character of Eliza in the guise of a Magyar princess in "My Fair Lady" was due to her first husband.

After Pascal's death she married George T. Delacorte, Jr. in 1959 and together with him became a philanthropist as well as safeguarding Pascal's correspondence and legacy. She outlived this second husband as well and in 1991 three years after his death, made her first donation of $1 million and five Old Master paintings to the Norton Museum of Art. In total she donated 60 paintings to the museum.

Delacorte died at her home in Palm Beach Gardens.

References

External links 
 
 The Disciple and His Devil: Gabriel Pascal and Bernard Shaw on google books

1914 births
2011 deaths
Actresses from Budapest
American memoirists
Hungarian film actresses
American art collectors
Women art collectors
American women memoirists
Hungarian emigrants to the United States
21st-century American women